The 1983–84 Nevada Wolf Pack men's basketball team represented the University of Nevada, Reno during the 1983–84 NCAA Division I men's basketball season. The Wolf Pack, led by second year head coach Sonny Allen, played their home games at the Lawlor Events Center on their campus in Reno, Nevada as members of the Big Sky Conference.

After finishing third in the conference regular season standings, Nevada won the Big Sky tournament to receive an automatic bid to the NCAA tournament as No. 11 seed in the West Region. The Wolf Pack was beaten by No. 6 seed Washington in the opening round, 64–54. The team finished with a record of 17–14 (7–7 Big Sky).

Roster

Schedule and results

|-
!colspan=9 style=| Regular season

|-
!colspan=9 style=| Big Sky tournament

|-
!colspan=9 style=| NCAA tournament

Source

References

Nevada Wolf Pack men's basketball seasons
Nevada
Nevada
Nevada Wolf Pack
Nevada Wolf Pack